'Little Dracula' is a 1991 animated series directed by Joe Pearson with original music by Stephen C. Marston under Walker Hahn Productions. It debuted on Fox Kids on 3 September 1991 and features the voices of several veteran comedians and actors. Based on the book series of the same name, thirteen episodes were produced, but only six were aired; five episodes aired the week of 3 – 6 September, before its timeslot was given to Beetlejuice. A sixth episode aired on Halloween. It was during this initial run that the Little Dracula franchise made its way to a handful of merchandising deals.

In 1999, Fox Family reran Little Dracula, including four episodes which had not aired during the original run (another three remained unaired). Some Little Dracula books were also republished following this brief revival.

A second season (13 more episodes) was co-produced with France and Germany, by IDDH, M6, and Renaissance-Atlantic Films. It never aired in the United States. In Europe, Little Dracula (Draculito, mon saigneur) is an animated series in 26 episodes.

Cast

Edan Gross as Little Dracula
Joe Flaherty as Big Dracula
Jonathan Winters as Igor and Granny
Kath Soucie as Mrs. Dracula and Millicent
Brian Cummings as Garlic Man
Neil Ross as Maggot
Danny Mann as No Eyes and Twin Beaks
Melvyn Hayes as Deadwood
Joey Camen as Werebunny
Fran Ryan as Hannah the Barbarian

Episodes

Season 1, part 1 (Fox Kids, 1991)

Season 1, part 2 (Fox Family, 1999)

Home releases
Numerous episodes of Little Dracula came to VHS throughout 1993 and '94. Available through Abbey Home Media, they appear to have been made available in PAL format only.

Action figures and other merchandise
The year Little Dracula debuted on Fox Kids, an action figure collection based on the characters hit store shelves. Produced by Bandai, the line includes Little Dracula, Drac Attack Little Dracula, Igor, Maggot, Werebunny, Garlic Man, Twin Beaks, The Man With No Eyes, and Deadwood. They each feature multiple points of articulation, several meticulous accessories, and a unique action feature (Igor's brain pops up when his arm is lifted). Vehicles of Little Dracula include the Coffin Car, Dracster, Easy-biter Motorcycle, and Garlicmobile.

Other merchandise includes costume and roleplaying sets such as Little Dracula's Vampire Kit and Little Dracula's Scepter & Amulet. Starting January 1992, Harvey Comics also published a 3-part Little Dracula comic book mini-series.

See also
Vampire film
List of vampire television series

References

External links

Fox Kids
American television shows based on children's books
American children's animated comedy television series
American children's animated horror television series
1990s American animated television series
1991 American television series debuts
1999 American television series endings
Fox Broadcasting Company original programming
Animated television series about children
Television series about vampires
Vampires in animated television
Vampires in television